Friars Quay is a residential development and an example of a high density, urban design of the 1970s. The development is located in the Colegate area at the centre of Norwich, Norfolk, bounded on one side by the River Wensum and by a park and two notable bridges to the east and west. Several historic churches surround the site creating an attractive and varied landscape. The population is included in the Mancroft ward of Norwich City.

The original design consists of an arrangement of terraces that include a series of open spaces winding through the scheme culminating in a principal space facing water stairs and a ramp to the Wensum. Elevations are economical in conception with a richness in variety and spacing. There is simple paving and the use of rolled gravel in the surfaces to the highways and communal areas. The development was the subject of an article in the Architectural Review in 1975.

In recognition of the quality of the design Norwich City Council proposed in early 2004 to apply for Article 4 (2) Direction in order to reinforce the covenants that exist on the development. In April 2007 the City Council indicated that it would not proceed with Article 4 Direction but would instead place the development on its list of buildings of architectural importance. Friars Quay forms part of the City Centre Conservation area.

In the 1970s Norwich City Council was seeking ways to encourage people to live in the centre of historic Norwich. Friars Quay was built on the former Jewsons Timber Yard.

City of Norwich formed a partnership with local developer RG Carter Ltd., to redevelop this prominent city centre industrial site. The scheme consists of 40 four and five bedroom townhouses and 9 ground floor flats.

On 3 May 1972 planning permission was given for "the development of a builders' merchants premises by the construction of roads, footpaths and 24 parking spaces and the erection of forty houses (22 with integral garages) at Colegate".  Included in the reasons for granting planning permission was "to protect and improve the amenity of the area, and ensure the maximum public use of the riverside".

The architect responsible for the design was David Luckhurst of Feilden & Mawson. Friars Quay has a very active Residents Association which has been involved in discussions regarding conservation.

History

The history of the site must reflect the history of the River Wensum itself. The immediate history however relates to the use of the site as a timber yard until it was made available for development.

Jewsons Timber Yard was established by John Wilson Jewson who shipped in timbers by wherries from Great Yarmouth.

In 1868 George Jewson purchased a 17th-century house in Colegate which was used as the headquarters of the business. His son Richard (1867 to 1949) established Jewsons as the largest timber merchants between the Thames and the Humber. Richard became Lord Mayor of Norwich in 1917.

The land was purchased by Norwich City Council in 1970.

References

External links
Friars Quay Norwich - A Framework For Change.  Produced by Norwich City Council - December 2004
Friars Quay Norwich - A Guide For Residents.  Produced by Norwich City Council - May 2005
The New Architecture of Central Norwich.  Produced by The Norwich Society - 2006.
Perceptions of Privacy and Density in House.  Report on Research Findings prepared for the Popular Housing Group - August 2003/

Official
 Communities and Local Government Dept. Friars Quay Overview
Government Guidance For Good Architectural Design Using Friars Quay as an example
  Communities and Local Government Dept. Chap. 2 The Bigger Picture (Ed. The Context)
  Communities and Local Government Dept. Chap. 6 Thinking About Space
  Communities and Local Government Dept. Chap. 7 Thoroughness In Design
  Communities and Local Government Dept. Chap.31 Movement and place-making (Ed. Connections To Existing Areas)
  Communities and Local Government Dept. Chap.32 Managing The Traffic
  Communities and Local Government Dept. Chap.53 Setbacks (Ed. From the Road Edge)
 https://web.archive.org/web/20070101131147/http://www.communities.gov.uk/pub/65/Chapter31Creatingamovementframework_id1505065.pdf
 The Norwich Society
 Norwich City Council
 Visit Norwich - Official visitor guide

History
 Norwich The Old City

Areas of Norwich